The Ministry of Labour is a ministry in the Burmese government responsible for the country's labour welfare and renders services to employers and workers. President Htin Kyaw combined Ministry of Labour, Employment and Social Security and Ministry of Immigration and Population to from the Ministry of Labour, Immigration and Population.On 1 August 2021, it was reformed as Ministry of Labour and Ministry of Immigration and Population following the formation of Caretaker Government by Min Aung Hlaing.

Departmental bodies
 Department of Labour
 Social Security Board
 Factories and General Labour Laws Inspection Department
 Department of Labour Relations

Main Functions

 Ensuring workers enjoy rights and protection granted under the various labour laws.
 Providing social services for the workers.
 Promoting higher productivity of labour.
 Participation in international labour affairs.

References

External links
 Social Security Board

Labour
Myanmar
Labour in Myanmar